Cinco Diablo is the sixth studio album by American rock band Saliva. It was released on December 16, 2008. Its first single was "Family Reunion" launched onto iTunes on October 28, 2008. The album debuted at #104 on the Billboard 200, making it their lowest-charting album in the band's history, and their first to chart outside the top 100.

A Deluxe Edition of the album is available exclusively from Best Buy, and it includes a 30 Minute Long Live DVD.

"Hunt You Down" was named the official theme song to WWE's PPV event, WWE No Way Out 2009 as well as CMT's Dog and Beth: On the Hunt

A music video has been filmed for "How Could You?", the second single.

The song "Family Reunion" can be heard throughout televised college basketball games on ESPN.

Track listing
All songs by Saliva and Bob Marlette.

Best Buy Exclusive: Bonus 30 Minute Live DVD track listing 
(Filmed at Chicago's House of Blues 11/07)

Menu: "I'm Coming Back" (from Cinco Diablo)

Credits
Credits adapted from album's liner notes.

Saliva
Josey Scott — lead vocals
Wayne Swinny — lead guitar, backing vocals
Jonathan Montoya — rhythm guitar
Dave Novotny — bass, backing vocals
Paul Crosby — drums

Production
Bob Marlette — producer, engineer, mixing
Sid Riggs — Pro Tools, editing
Ryan J-W Smith — mastering

References

2008 albums
Saliva (band) albums
Southern rock albums